Auensteiner–Radsporttage was a women's cycle race that took place in Germany, and was previously rated by the Union Cycliste Internationale (UCI) as a 2.2 category race.

Winners

References

Cycle races in Germany
Women's road bicycle races
2010 establishments in Germany
Recurring sporting events established in 2010
2019 disestablishments in Germany
Recurring sporting events disestablished in 2019